Maxime D'Hoore (born 7 March 1978) is a retired Belgian football striker.

References

1978 births
Living people
Belgian people of Burkinabé descent
Sportspeople of Burkinabé descent
Belgian footballers
Club Brugge KV players
K.R.C. Zuid-West-Vlaanderen players
K.V. Kortrijk players
Association football forwards
Belgian Pro League players
Romanian expatriate footballers
Expatriate footballers in Hungary
Romanian expatriate sportspeople in Hungary
People from Ouagadougou